Please add names of notable painters with a Wikipedia page, in precise English alphabetical order, using U.S. spelling conventions. Country and regional names refer to where painters worked for long periods, not to personal allegiances.

Kaburagi Kiyokata (鏑木清方, 1878–1972), Japanese nihonga artist
Ingrida Kadaka (born 1967), Latvian artist, book designer and illustrator
Charles S. Kaelin (1858–1929), American painter
Frida Kahlo (1907–1954), Mexican painter
Wolf Kahn (born 1927), American painter
Kaigetsudō Anchi (壊月堂安知, c. 1700–1716), Japanese ukiyo-e artist
Kaigetsudō Ando (壊月堂安度, c. 1671–1743), Japanese ukiyo-e artist
Kailash Chandra Meher (born 1954), Indian artist, inventor and social activist
Jacob Kainen (1909–2001), American painter and print-maker
Willem Kalf (1619–1693), Dutch painter
Jitish Kallat (born 1974), Indian painter and multimedia artist
Kamagurka (born 1956), Belgian painter, cartoonist and comedian
Lev Lvovich Kamenev (1833–1886), Russian landscape painter
Kamisaka Sekka (神坂雪佳, 1866–1942), Japanese artist and designer
Kanbun Master (寛文大師, c. 1660–1673), Japanese woodblock printer
Wassily Kandinsky (1866–1944), Russian/Soviet painter and art theorist
Paul Kane (1810–1871), Canadian painter
Rajmund Kanelba (1897–1960), Polish painter
Kanō Eitoku (狩野永徳, 1543–1590), Japanese painter
Kanō Hōgai (狩野芳崖, 1828–1888), Japanese painter
Kanō Masanobu (狩野正信, 1434–1530), Japanese painter
Kanō Mitsunobu (狩野光信, 1565–1608), Japanese painter
Kanō Motonobu (狩野元信, 1476–1559), Japanese painter
Kanō Naizen (狩野内膳, 1570–1616), Japanese painter
Kanō Sanraku (狩野山楽, 1559–1635), Japanese painter
Kanō Sansetsu (狩野山雪, 1589–1651), Japanese painter
Kanō Shōsenin (狩野勝川院, 1823–1880), Japanese painter
Kanō Takanobu (狩野孝信, 1571–1618), Japanese painter
Kanō Tan'yū (狩野探幽, 1602–1674), Japanese painter
Kanō Tanshin (狩野探信, 1653–1718), Japanese painter
Alexander Kanoldt (1881–1939), German painter
Howard Kanovitz (1929–2009), American artist
Nabil Kanso (born 1946), American painter
Tadeusz Kantor (1915–1990), Polish painter and assemblage artist
Leon Kapliński (1826–1873), Polish painter and activist
Edmond Xavier Kapp (1890–1978), English painter, draftsman and caricaturist
Bertalan Karlovszky (1858–1938), Hungarian painter
Alfons Karpiński (1875–1961), Polish painter
Jan Karpíšek (born 1981), Czech painter
Nikolai Alekseyevich Kasatkin (1859–1930), Russian/Soviet painter
Luigi Kasimir (1881–1962), Austrian painter, etcher and print-maker
Vytautas Kasiulis (1918–1995), Lithuanian/French painter and print-maker
János Kass (1927–2010), Hungarian illustrator, print-maker and film director
Lajos Kassák (1887–1967), Hungarian painter, poet and writer
Eizō Katō (加藤栄三, 1906–1972), Japanese nihonga painter
Tōichi Katō (加藤東一, 1916–1996), Japanese nihonga painter
Nándor Katona (1864–1932), Hungarian painter
Katsukawa Shunchō (勝川春潮, fl. 1783–1795), Japanese ukiyo-e print-maker
Katsukawa Shun'ei (勝川春英, 1762–1819), Japanese ukiyo-e print artist
Katsukawa Shunkō I (勝川春好, 1743–1812), Japanese ukiyo-e print-maker
Katsukawa Shunsen (勝川春扇, 1762 – c. 1830), Japanese ukiyo-e print and book designer
Katsukawa Shunshō (勝川春章, 1726–1792), Japanese painter and print-maker
Alex Katz (born 1927), American painter, sculptor and print-maker
Hanns Katz (1892–1940), German painter and graphic artist
Angelica Kauffman (1741–1807), Swiss/English painter
Isidor Kaufman (1853–1921), Hungarian painter
František Kaván (1866–1941), Austro-Hungarian/Czechoslovak painter and poet
Kawabata Ryūshi (川端龍子, 1885–1966), Japanese painter
Kawai Gyokudō (川合玉堂, 1873–1957), Japanese painter
Kawanabe Kyōsai (河鍋暁斎, 1831–1889), Japanese painter
Kawase Hasui (川瀬巴水, 1883–1957), Japanese print designer
John Kay (1742–1826), Scottish caricaturist and engraver
Otis Kaye (1885–1974), American painter
Ke Jiusi (柯九思, 1290–1343), Chinese painter, calligrapher and poet
John Keane (born 1954), English painter
Carl Eugen Keel (1885–1961), Swiss painter
Adam Dario Keel (born 1924), Swiss artist
Keisai Eisen (渓斎英泉, 1790–1848), Japanese ukiyo-e print-maker
Gusztáv Kelety (1834–1902), Hungarian painter
Albert Keller (1844–1920), German painter
Gerald Kelley (living), American children's book illustrator
Ellsworth Kelly (1923–2015), American painter, sculptor and print-maker
Gerald Kelly (1879–1972), English painter
Jane Kelly (born 1956), English artist and journalist
Paul Kelpe (1902–1985), German/American painter
Jeka Kemp (1876–1966), Scottish painter and woodcut artist
Richard Gordon Kendall (1933–2008), American artist
Rockwell Kent (1882–1971), American painter, print-maker and writer
Dóra Keresztes (born 1953), Hungarian painter, print-maker and film director
Károly Kernstok (1873–1940), Hungarian painter
Georg Friedrich Kersting (1785–1847), German painter
Jan van Kessel the Younger (1654–1708), Flemish/Spanish painter
Jan van Kessel the Elder (1626–1679), Flemish painter
Morris Kestelman (1905–1998), English artist and art teacher
Thomas de Keyser (1596–1667), Dutch painter and architect
I Ketut Soki (born 1946), Indonesian (Balinese) artist
Annabel Kidston (1896–1981), Scottish painter, etcher and illustrator
Anselm Kiefer (born 1945), German painter and sculptor
Michel Kikoine (1892–1968), Lithuanian/French painter
Kikuchi Yōsai (菊池容斎, 1781–1878), Japanese painter
Ada Gladys Killins (1901–1963), Canadian artist and educator
Sarah Louisa Kilpack (1839–1909), English painter
Kim Deuk-sin (김득신, 1754–1822), Korean court painter
Kim Du-ryang (김두량, 1696–1763), Korean painter
Kim Eung-hwan (김응환, 1742–1789), Korean royal painter
Kim Hong-do (김홍도, 1745–1806) Korean royal painter
Kim Hwan-gi (김환기, 1913–1974), Korean artist
Kim Jeong-hui, (김정희, 1786–1856), Korean calligrapher and scholar
Kim Myeong-guk, (김명국, born 1600), Korean painter
Kim Tschang Yeul (김창열, born 1929), Korean/South Korean painter
Charles Bird King (1785–1862), American artist
Dorothy King (1907–1990), English artist, curator and teacher
Jessie M. King (1875–1949), Scottish illustrator
Eduardo Kingman (1913–1998), Ecuadorian artist
Thomas Kinkade (1958–2012), American painter
Alison Kinnaird (born 1949), Scottish glass sculptor, musician and writer
Jan Kip (1653–1722), Dutch/English draftsman and engraver
Ernst Ludwig Kirchner (1880–1938), German painter and print-maker
Raphael Kirchner (1867–1917), Austrian painter and illustrator
Per Kirkeby (born 1938), Danish painter, sculptor and poet
Ryūsei Kishida, (岸田劉生, 1891–1929), Japanese painter
Károly Kisfaludy (1788–1830), Hungarian artist and dramatist
Moïse Kisling (1891–1953), French/American painter
Bálint Kiss (1802–1868), Hungarian painter
Herbert Kisza (born 1943), Czech painter and sculptor
Kitagawa Utamaro (喜多川歌麿, 1753–1806), Japanese ukiyo-e print-maker and painter
R. B. Kitaj (born 1932), American/English artist
Kiyohara Tama (清原玉, 1861–1939), Japanese/Italian painter
Roar Kjernstad (born 1975), Norwegian painter
Konrad Klapheck (born 1935), German painter and graphic artist
Mati Klarwein (1932–2002), German painter
Paul Klee (1879–1940), Swiss/German artist
Yves Klein (1928–1962), French artist
Joseph Kleitsch (1885–1931), Hungarian/American painter
Heinrich Kley (1863–1945), German illustrator and painter
Karel Klíč (1841–1926), Austro-Hungarian/Czechoslovak artist and illustrator
Gustav Klimt (1862–1918), Austrian painter
Franz Kline (1910–1962), American painter
Julius Klinger (1876–1942), Austrian painter, illustrator and writer
Max Klinger (1857–1920), German painter, print-maker and writer
Hilma af Klint (1862–1944), Swedish artist and mystic
Juraj Julije Klović (1498–1578), Croatian/Italian illuminator, miniaturist and painter
Ludwig Knaus (1829–1910), German painter
Laura Knight (1877–1970), English painter, etcher and engraver
Jesper Knudsen (born 1964), Danish painter
Kobayashi Kiyochika (小林清親, 1847–1915), Japanese ukiyo-e print-maker
Martin Kober (1550–1598), Central European court painter
Ivana Kobilca (1861–1962), Austro-Hungarian (Slovene)/Yugoslav painter
Christen Købke (1810–1848), Danish painter
Aleksander Kobzdej (1920–1972), Polish painter
Max Friedrich Koch (1859–1930), German painter, art professor and photographer
Ibrahim Kodra (1918–2006), Albanian/Italian painter
Robert Koehler (1850–1917), German/American painter and art teacher
Narashige Koide (小出楢重, 1887–1931), Japanese painter and illustrator
Ryōhei Koiso (小磯良平, 1903–1988), Japanese artist
Junsaku Koizumi (小泉淳作, born 1924), Japanese painter and pottery artist
Oskar Kokoschka (1886–1980), Austrian artist, poet and playwright
Andrei Kolkoutine (born 1957), Russian painter and sculptor
Rudolf Koller (1828–1905), Swiss painter
Käthe Kollwitz (1867–1945), German painter, print-maker and sculptor
Ludwik Konarzewski (1885–1954), Polish painter, sculptor and art teacher
Ludwik Konarzewski Jr (1918–1989), Polish painter, sculptor and art teacher
Jan Konůpek (1883–1950), Austro-Hungarian/Czechoslovak painter, illustrator and engraver
Béla Kondor (1931–1972), Hungarian painter, writer and poet
Jacob Koninck (c. 1615 – c. 1695), Dutch painter
Philip de Koninck (1619–1688), Dutch painter
Salomon Koninck (1609–1656), Dutch painter and engraver
Kōno Michisei (1895–1950), Japanese painter, illustrator and print-maker
Willem de Kooning (1904–1997), American Abstract Expressionist artist
Jeff Koons (born 1955), American artist and sculptor
Frans Koppelaar (born 1943), Dutch painter
Jaroslava Korol (1954–2009), Soviet/Ukrainian painter
Aladár Körösfői-Kriesch (1863–1920), Hungarian painter
Konstantin Korovin (1861–1939), Russian/French painter
Koryusai Isoda (礒田湖龍斎, 1735–1790), Japanese print designer and painter
Kose Kanaoka (巨勢金岡, 9th c.), Japanese court painter
Jerzy Kossak (1886–1955), Polish painter
Juliusz Kossak (1824–1899), Polish painter and illustrator
Wojciech Kossak (1857–1942), Polish painter
Franciszek Kostrzewski (1826–1911), Polish illustrator, cartoonist and painter
József Koszta (1861–1949), Hungarian painter
Albert Kotin (1907–1980), American artist
Aleksander Kotsis (1836–1877), Polish painter
Ivan Kramskoi (1837–1887), Russian painter and art critic
Andre de Krayewski (born 1933), Polish/American artist
Albert Henry Krehbiel (1873–1945), American painter
Jürg Kreienbühl (1932–2007), Swiss/French painter
Kristian Kreković (1901–1985), Yugoslav/Croatian painter and ethnographer
Pinchus Kremegne (1890–1981), Lithuanian/French sculptor, painter and lithographer
Christian Krohg (1852–1925), Norwegian painter, illustrator and author
Per Krohg (1889–1965), Norwegian artist
Leon Kroll (1884–1974), American painter and lithographer
Julius Kronberg, Swedish Painter
Peder Severin Krøyer (1851–1909), Danish painter
Marie Krøyer (1867–1940), Danish painter
Mārtiņš Krūmiņš (1900–1992), Latvian/American painter
Alfred Krupa (1915–1989), Yugoslav (Croatian) painter
Alfred Freddy Krupa (born 1971), Yugoslav/Croatian painter, draftsman and teacher
Martina Krupičková (born 1975), Czechoslovak/Czech painter
Izidor Kršnjavi (1845–1927), Austro-Hungarian (Croatian)/Yugoslav painter, art historian and politician
Konrad Krzyżanowski (1872–1922), Polish (Ukrainian) illustrator and painter
Otakar Kubín (1883–1969), Austro-Hungarian (Czech)/French painter and sculptor
Bohumil Kubista (1884–1918), Austro-Hungarian (Czech) painter and art critic
Alexander Kucharsky (1741–1819), Polish/French painter
Arkhip Kuindzhi (1847–1910), Russian painter
Igor Kufayev (born 1966) Russian/English artist and spiritual teacher
Kume Keiichiro (1866–1934), Japanese yōga painter
Kun Can (髡殘, 1612 – post-1674), Chinese painter
Yasuo Kuniyoshi (国吉康雄, 1893–1953), Japanese/American painter, photographer and print-maker
Jan Kupecký (1667–1740), Bohemian (Czech)/Hungarian painter
František Kupka (1871–1957), Austro-Hungarian/Czechoslovak painter and graphic artist
Alexander V. Kuprin (1880–1960), Russian/Soviet painter
Kuroda Seiki (黒田清輝, 1866–1924), Japanese painter and teacher
Yayoi Kusama (草間彌生, born 1929), Japanese sculptor, painter and writer
Boris Kustodiev (1878–1927), Russian/Soviet painter and stage designer
Kusumi Morikage (久隅守景, 1620–1690), Japanese painter
Vilhelm Kyhn (1819–1903), Danish painter

References
References can be found under each entry.

K